Marko Kristal (born 2 June 1973) is an Estonian football manager and former player. He is the assistant manager of Nõmme Kalju.

Kristal played as a midfielder for Lõvid, Sport Tallinn, Flora, FC Lahti and the Estonia national team. With Flora, he won seven Meistriliiga titles, two Estonian Cups and two Estonian Supercups. Kristal made his international debut in Estonia's first official match since restoration of independence on 3 June 1992, a 1–1 draw against Slovenia. In 2001, he became the first Estonian player to make 100 appearances for the national team. He made a total of 143 appearances for Estonia, scoring nine goals.

After retiring as a player, Kristal became a manager. He has coached Tammeka, Levadia and Tulevik. Kristal won two Meistriliiga titles, two Estonian Cups and two Estonian Supercups with Levadia.

Club career

Early career
Kristal began playing football for a local club Tallinna Lõvid (Lions of Tallinn), where he was coached Roman Ubakivi. In 1989, he played for Soviet Second League club Sport Tallinn.

Flora
In 1990, Kristal joined Flora, a new club founded as a successor to the Lõvid team. With Flora, he won seven Meistriliiga titles, in 1993–94, 1994–95, 1997–98, 1998, 2001, 2002 and 2003, two Estonian Cups, in 1994–95 and 1997–98, and two Estonian Supercups, in 1998 and 2003. Kristal retired from professional football after the 2004 season. He made a total of 263 Meistriliiga appearances for Flora, scoring 51 goals.

IF Elfsborg (loan)
On 12 April 1999, Kristal joined Allsvenskan club IF Elfsborg on a two-month loan.

FC Lahti (loan)
In December 1999, Kristal moved to Veikkausliiga club FC Lahti on a season-long loan.

International career
Kristal made his international debut for Estonia on 3 June 1992, replacing Urmas Kirs in the 77th minute of a historic 1–1 draw against Slovenia in a friendly at Kadriorg Stadium. The match was Estonia's first official match since restoration of independence and Slovenia's first match ever. He scored his first international goal on 24 February 1996, in a 2–2 draw against Faroe Islands in a friendly. From 1995 to 1998, Kristal played in 42 consecutive national team matches. On 28 March 2001, he became the first player to make 100 appearances for Estonia and the youngest player to make his 100th appearance for a European national team after starting in 2002 FIFA World Cup qualifier against Cyprus, and scored in the 2–2 away draw. Kristal finished his international career with a testimonial match on 20 April 2005, a 1–2 home loss to Norway. He made a total of 143 appearances for Estonia, scoring nine goals.

Career statistics
Scores and results list Estonia's goal tally first, score column indicates score after each Kristal goal.

Honours

Player
Flora
Meistriliiga: 1993–94, 1994–95, 1997–98, 1998, 2001, 2002, 2003
Estonian Cup: 1994–95, 1997–98
Estonian Supercup: 1998, 2003

Manager
Levadia
Meistriliiga: 2013, 2014
Estonian Cup: 2011–12, 2013–14
Estonian Supercup: 2013, 2015

Individual
 Order of the Estonian Red Cross, 5th Class

See also 
 List of men's footballers with 100 or more international caps

References

External links

1973 births
Living people
Footballers from Tallinn
Soviet footballers
Estonian footballers
Estonian football managers
Association football midfielders
Esiliiga players
JK Tervis Pärnu players
Meistriliiga players
FC Flora players
Allsvenskan players
IF Elfsborg players
Veikkausliiga players
FC Lahti players
Estonia international footballers
FIFA Century Club
FCI Levadia Tallinn managers
Viljandi JK Tulevik managers
Estonian expatriate footballers
Estonian expatriate sportspeople in Sweden
Expatriate footballers in Sweden
Estonian expatriate sportspeople in Finland
Expatriate footballers in Finland